Léo Malet (7 March 1909 – 3 March 1996) was a French crime novelist and surrealist.

Biography
Leo Malet was born in Montpellier. He had little formal education and began work as a cabaret singer at "La Vache Enragee" in Montmartre, Paris in 1925.

In the 1930s, he was closely aligned with the Surrealists, and was close friends with André Breton, René Magritte and Yves Tanguy, amongst others. During this time, he published several volumes of poetry.

He died in Châtillon, a little town just south of Paris where he had lived for most of his life, four days before his 87th birthday.

Works
Though he dabbled in many genres, Malet is most famous for Nestor Burma, the anti-hero of Les Nouveaux Mystères de Paris. Burma, a cynical private detective, is an astute speaker of argot (French slang), an ex-Anarchist, a serial monogamist and an inveterate pipe smoker. Of the 33 novels detailing his adventures, eighteen each take place in a sole arrondissement of Paris, in a sub-series of his exploits that Malet dubbed the "New Mysteries of Paris" quoting Eugene Sue's seminal "feuilleton". However, Malet never completed the full 20 arrondissements as he originally planned. Apart from the novels, five short stories were also published, bringing the total of Burma's adventures to 38.

The comic artist Jacques Tardi adapted some of Malet's books, much to the author's approval. Malet claimed that Tardi was the sole person to have visually understood his books. Tardi also provided cover illustrations for the Fleuve Noir editions of the novels, which were published from the 1980s onward.

Selected bibliography
 120, rue de la Gare (1943)
 Le cinquième procédé (1948)
 Le soleil naît derrière le Louvre (1954) (First of the "New Mysteries of Paris" series)
 Des kilomètres de linceuls (1955)
 Fièvre au Marais (1955)
 La nuit de Saint-Germain-des-Prés (1955) 
 M'as-tu vu en cadavre (1956)
 Brouillard au pont de Tolbiac (1956)
 Casse-pipe à la Nation (1957)
 Micmac moche au Boul' Mich'  (1957)
 Nestor Burma court la poupée (1971)
 Poste restante (1983)

Comic book adaptations
 Brouillard au pont de Tolbiac (Casterman, 1982); drawn by: Jacques Tardi
 120, rue de la Gare (Casterman, 1988); drawn by: Jacques Tardi
 Une gueule de bois en plomb (Casterman, 1990); drawn by: Jacques Tardi
 Casse-pipe à la Nation (Casterman, 1996); drawn by: Jacques Tardi
 M'as-tu vu en cadavre ? (Casterman, 2000); drawn by: Jacques Tardi

Filmography 
120, rue de la Gare, directed by Jacques Daniel-Norman (1946), with René Dary (as Nestor Burma)
La Nuit d'Austerlitz, directed by Stellio Lorenzi (TV film, 1954), with Daniel Sorano (as Nestor Burma)
The Enigma of the Folies-Bergere, directed by Jean Mitry (1959), with Bella Darvi, Frank Villard, Dora Doll
La Nuit de Saint-Germain-des-Prés, directed by Bob Swaim (1977), with Michel Galabru (as Nestor Burma)
Nestor Burma, détective de choc, directed by Jean-Luc Miesch (1982), with Michel Serrault (as Nestor Burma), Jane Birkin
Les Rats de Montsouris, directed by Maurice Frydland (TV film, 1988), with Gérard Desarthe (as Nestor Burma)
Nestor Burma (TV series, 39 episodes, 1991–2003), with Guy Marchand (as Nestor Burma)

External links
Short biography in Italian

1909 births
1996 deaths
Writers from Montpellier
French crime fiction writers
French surrealist writers
20th-century French novelists
French male novelists
20th-century French male writers